The Desert Song is an operetta with music by Sigmund Romberg and book and lyrics by Oscar Hammerstein II and Otto Harbach, and also the title song "The Desert Song" sung by Pierre and Margot

The Desert Song may also refer to:

Film
 The Desert Song (1929 film)
 The Desert Song (1939 film) (original: Das Lied der Wüste) by Paul Martin
 The Desert Song (1943 film)
 The Desert Song (1953 film)

See also
 "Desert Song", a song by Def Leppard
 "Desert Song", a song by My Chemical Romance
 "Desert Song", a song from Hillsong Live's album This Is Our God
 "Desert Song", a song from Stanley Clarke's album School Days
 "A Horse with No Name", a song by America originally titled "Desert Song"